Nikola Ćaćić and Mate Pavić were the defending champions, but they chose not to participate this year. Henri Kontinen and Édouard Roger-Vasselin won the title, defeating Jonathan Erlich and Andrei Vasilevski in the final, 6–2, 7–5.

Seeds

Draw

Draw

References

External links
 Main Draw

Doubles